Alberto Bertuccelli (14 January 1924 – 15 August 2002) was an Italian professional footballer who played as a defender.

Honours
Juventus
 Serie A champion: 1949–50, 1951–52.

External links
 

1924 births
2002 deaths
People from Viareggio
Italian footballers
Italy international footballers
Serie A players
S.S.D. Lucchese 1905 players
Juventus F.C. players
A.S. Roma players
U.S. Città di Pontedera players
Association football defenders
Footballers from Tuscany
Sportspeople from the Province of Lucca